Ninjai: The Little Ninja is a Flash cartoon. The cartoon has not been available online since April 2015.

Overview
The cartoon is a creation of The Ninjai Gang. Ninjai is a web-based animation that centers around the life of Ninjai, a young samurai/ninja who is traveling the world looking for meaning and purpose. Along the way, his path is crossed by rogues or people who help him. Ninjai's best friend is 'Little Bird', a cute and brave sidekick with whom Ninjai often converses.

History
Ninjai first appeared on June 4 2001 as a trailer created using Adobe Flash, and had a trademark filed for its title on June 14 2001. The animation series drew a strong following with its unique style and storyline at the time, and ended up producing a total of 12 episodes thereafter, each a few minutes in length.

Despite being made by martial artists who did animation only as a hobby, the quality of the animation grew steadily as the episodes progressed, with more time between each episode as a result. After the release of episode 12, production came to a pause, with the promise of further episodes on the way. Some time later, news broke that the group was abandoning the short-form animations and aiming for a feature-length production with a complete studio. In early 2015, the group posted to their social media channels on Facebook and Twitter with media kits and wallpapers, and asked their followers to recommend blogs to advertise Ninjai in exchange for inside scoops on the series' production. On March 5 2015, a Kickstarter crowdfunding campaign was announced and possible reward ideas were shared for the following 5 months, but the campaign was never officially launched on Kickstarter.

Despite this, the Ninjai website remained functional through at least August 2019, and at New York Comic Con in 2021, The Ninjai Gang had a booth set up to showcase a trailer and give away merchandise, advertising that the full-length feature production was still in the works, with an initial release date of January 2022. However, as of January 2023, IMDb states that it is in post-production with an outdated release date of 2022.

As of early January 2023, the Ninjai.com website had been accessible but showing only a message that it was "under maintenance" for a significant amount of time, with The Ninjai Gang not responding to inquiries. Later that month, the Ninjai.com domain ceased to resolve to a website, and became completely unavailable, though the domain is still registered until at least April 2025. The social media channels and existence of Ninjai.com on the Wayback Machine have been removed. The trade names and licenses have mostly expired, though a license for NINJAI GANG, LLC is listed as "Active", having been registered on November 10 2004 with a partner term date of December 31 1,000,000 AD.

The Science of Identity Foundation's founder Chris Butler (a.k.a. Srila Prabupad), halted all ties to the group and seized production.

Sunset Studios (another form of The Ninjai Gang) picked up the trademark for Ninjai and is currently listed as the owner party, but sometime thereafter seems to have dropped the series and the trademark is now abandoned.

Characters
 Ninjai: The titular protagonist of the series is a boy of unstated age with an unnatural skill as a warrior. Not much is known about his identity; he seems to suffer from a form of amnesia and is on a quest to find out about himself, addressing questions such as "Who am I?" and "What is my purpose in life?"
 "Little Bird": A small, grey and brown canary bird that Ninjai befriends. It is a loyal friend, who cares about Ninjai, staying with him even in the Swamp of Ghosts.
 Dotoshi of the Blue Lotus clan: A mysterious man that Ninjai meets during his travels, aiding him by helping him cross a river. His, or his clan's, purposes are unknown, and he has not re-appeared.
 The mad inventor: An eccentric who swears in most of his sentences. Ninjai helps him out of an unseen contraption that managed to snag him with a rope, leaving him hanging by his feet from a tree.
 Maha: An old man that Ninjai is seeking. He is believed to have gone to the Keoki mountains, leaving the village of Yamuri behind. He is not yet seen, by name, in the series.
 Takagawa of the Red Dragon clan: An evil, broadsword-wielding man. He is a sadistic, mentally unstable villain in the series who takes pleasure in others' pain.
 Sakuri of the Red Dragon clan: Apparently Takagawa's right-hand man. Though he speaks little, he displays loyalty towards his master Takagawa and apparently enjoys the evil works about. He has a mystical tattoo of a snake that can move off of his arm and into a stringed weapon to allow it to fly, hone onto and attack targets. The serpent that forms from the union of weapon and tattoo is killed in chapter 12 by Ninjai, causing grief to Sakuri. It is unknown if there is, or will be, long-term effects of this form of severance.

References

External links
 Ninjai Website
 Ninjai Gang's original live-action adventure web series KarmaKula
 Ninjai photo gallery at G4TV
 Animosity Online: The Essentials - Ninjai (Internet Archive cached page)

American flash animated web series
Fictional ninja
Martial arts web series